The Blackspot minigoby (Minysicya caudimaculata) is a species of goby native to the eastern Indian Ocean and the western Pacific Ocean from Australia to Japan to the Tuamotus and French Polynesia where it can be found inhabiting reefs at depths of from .  Males of this species grow to a length of  SL while females can reach a length of  SL.  This species is the only known member of its genus.

References

Gobiidae
Monotypic fish genera
Fish described in 2002
Taxa named by Helen K. Larson